"Message In Our Music" was a hit song for the R&B vocal group The O'Jays in 1976 from their album, Message in the Music. Written by famed songwriters Kenny Gamble and Leon Huff, it spent a week at number one on the R&B singles chart in October, 1976, and peaked at number forty-nine on the Billboard Hot 100 singles chart.

Chart history

References

[ Song review] on Allmusic

1976 songs
1976 singles
The O'Jays songs
Songs written by Leon Huff
Philadelphia International Records singles
Songs written by Kenny Gamble
Songs about music